Péter Baczakó (born 27 September 1951 in Ercsi – d. 1 April 2008 in Budapest) was a Hungarian weightlifter.

He won a bronze medal at the 1976 Summer Olympics and a gold medal at the 1980 Summer Olympics. Overall Baczako won a total of 23 medals, including four gold, at world and European championships from 1973 to 1982. He spent his whole career at the Budapest club BKV-Elore, where he became a coach after he retired from competing.

Peter Baczako died on April 1, 2008, in Budapest of cancer. He had also been diagnosed with muscular dystrophy and spent his last months in a wheelchair.

References

External links
 
  
 
 

1951 births
2008 deaths
Hungarian male weightlifters
Olympic weightlifters of Hungary
Olympic gold medalists for Hungary
Olympic bronze medalists for Hungary
Sportspeople from Fejér County
Weightlifters at the 1976 Summer Olympics
Weightlifters at the 1980 Summer Olympics
Deaths from cancer in Hungary
Olympic medalists in weightlifting
Medalists at the 1980 Summer Olympics
Medalists at the 1976 Summer Olympics
20th-century Hungarian people
21st-century Hungarian people